The Emblem of Sikkim is currently used as the official seal of the Government of Sikkim, India. It was earlier used as the coat of arms of the House of Namgyal and the Kingdom of Sikkim. The emblem is known as the Kham-sum-wangdu. It was designed in 1877 by Robert Taylor.

Symbolism
The blazon consists of a lotus within a chain of 12 annulets. The lotus is a symbol of purity and a lotus throne is a symbol of the attainment of enlightenment. It is also a symbol of administrative power. Lotus thrones are the pedestal for most important figures in Buddhist art.

Historical emblems

Government Banner

The Government of Sikkim can be represented by a banner that depicts the emblem of the state on a white background.

See also
 Flag of Sikkim
 National Emblem of India
 List of Indian state emblems

References

External links

Flag and seal of Sikkim at flaggenlexikon.de

Sikkim
 
History of Sikkim
Sikkim
Sikkim
Sikkim
Sikkim